Kate McCann (born 1988/1989) is a British journalist. She has been the political editor of TalkTV since April 2022. McCann was previously a political correspondent for Sky News between 2018 and 2022 and The Daily Telegraphs senior political correspondent between 2015 and 2018.

Early life and education
McCann was born in London, England. She attended a comprehensive school in Yorkshire, before she studied politics at Newcastle University, graduating in 2009. While at university, she was a news editor for the student newspaper, The Courier.

Career
After graduation, McCann worked in parliament as an MP's researcher till 2011.

In September 2015, McCann joined The Telegraph as senior political correspondent, after having previously worked for The Guardian, City A.M., and as The Suns Whitehall correspondent. Her stories at The Telegraph included the publication of a leaked draft of Labour leader Jeremy Corbyn's manifesto, less than a month before the 2017 general election. She later described it as the highlight of her career in a 2022 interview. The following year, she became the Chair of the Press Gallery, only the second female chair in its 200-year history.

She left The Telegraph in July 2018 to join Sky News as a political correspondent. After four years at Sky News, she became the political editor of TalkTV. In July 2022, McCann co-hosted TalkTV's televised election debate between Rishi Sunak and Liz Truss, the two remaining candidates for the leadership of the Conservative Party. During the debate when Truss was making a speech, McCann fainted; as a result, the show came off air and was later cancelled. She recovered shortly afterwards and apologised to both candidates on social media.

She has co-hosted a Sunday morning political show on Times Radio since September 2022.

References 

British political journalists
The Daily Telegraph people
The Sun (United Kingdom) people
The Guardian journalists
British women journalists
Alumni of Newcastle University
Year of birth missing (living people)
Living people